Konsko is a village located in the Gevgelija Municipality of North Macedonia. As of the 2002 census it had a population of 4.

Demographics
As of the 2021 census, Konsko had 11 residents with the following ethnic composition:
Macedonians 10
Persons for whom data are taken from administrative sources 1

According to the 2002 census, the village had a total of 4 inhabitants. Ethnic groups in the village include:
Macedonians 4

References

Villages in Gevgelija Municipality
Megleno-Romanian settlements